Bennie Jauan Jennings (born July 10, 1997) is an American football wide receiver for the San Francisco 49ers of the National Football League (NFL). He played college football at Tennessee, and was selected by the 49ers in the seventh round of the 2020 NFL Draft.

Early years
Jennings attended Blackman High School in Murfreesboro, Tennessee. He played quarterback in high school. A four-star recruit, Jennings committed to the University of Tennessee to play college football.

College career
Jennings played at Tennessee from 2015 to 2019 under head coaches Butch Jones and Jeremy Pruitt. He converted to wide receiver in college.

In the 2015 season, Jennings was an instant contributor. In his collegiate debut against Bowling Green, he had three receptions for 56 yards in the 59–30 victory. Later on in the season, in a 28–27 loss to rival Florida, he showed off his dual-threat ability when he threw a 58-yard touchdown pass to quarterback Joshua Dobbs on a trick play.

In the 2016 season, Jennings role in the offense expanded. He recorded his first game with over 100 receiving yards with three receptions for 111 receiving yards and a touchdown in a 38–28 victory over Florida sealing an 18-point comeback for the Vols. The win was Tennessee's first over the Gators since the 2004 season. In the following game against rival Georgia, Jennings recorded the game-winning reception on a 43-yard Hail Mary from Dobbs to put the Vols up for good 34–31. Jennings finished the 2016 season with 40 receptions for 580 receiving yards and seven receiving touchdowns.

In 2017, Jennings appeared in only one game due to a wrist injury but was dismissed from the team under interim head coach Brady Hoke later in the season. He was reinstated for the next season by then-new head coach Jeremy Pruitt for the 2018 season. He earned a medical redshirt for his time missed in the 2017 season. In the 2018 season, Jennings appeared in 11 games and recorded 30 receptions for 438 receiving yards and three receiving touchdowns.

In the 2019 season, Jennings was a key contributor for the Vols during their 8–5 season. He recorded four games with at least 100 receiving yards. His best output came in a victory against South Carolina, where he had seven receptions for 174 receiving yards and two receiving touchdowns. Overall, he finished his senior season with 59 receptions for 969 receiving yards and eight receiving touchdowns. During his collegiate career, he had 146 receptions for 2,153 yards and 18 touchdowns.

Collegiate statistics

Professional career

Jennings was selected by the San Francisco 49ers in the seventh round with the 217th overall pick of the 2020 NFL Draft. He was waived on September 5, 2020, and signed to the practice squad the next day. He was placed on the practice squad/injured list on October 24. He signed a reserve/future contract on January 4, 2021.

Over the course of the 2021 season, Jennings established himself as the 49ers third wideout. He registered his first career touchdown in Week 2 against the Philadelphia Eagles, and by the end of November had become an integral part of the offense. Over the final five weeks of the 2021 season, Jennings recorded 16 receptions for 212 receiving yards and three receiving touchdowns, including a career-high six receptions for 94 receiving yards and two receiving touchdowns in a must-win week 18 matchup with the Los Angeles Rams. His production continued in the playoffs, with Jennings recording at least one reception in each round before the 49ers exited in the NFC Championship.

In the 2022 season, Jennings appeared in 16 games, of which he started four. He finished the 2022 season with 35 receptions for 416 receiving yards and one receiving touchdown.

References

External links

San Francisco 49ers bio
Tennessee Volunteers bio

1997 births
Living people
People from Murfreesboro, Tennessee
Players of American football from Tennessee
American football wide receivers
Tennessee Volunteers football players
San Francisco 49ers players